Fernando Ramallo (born 3 April 1980 in Madrid) is a Spanish actor.

Roles

Films
Donne-moi la main (Give Me Your Hand) (2008)
Ejecutores (2008)
El corazón de la tierra (2007)
WC (2005)
Mola ser malo (2005)
Donde nadie nos ve (2005)
Condon Express (2005)
A + (Amas) (2004)
Seres queridos (2003)
El despropósito (2004)
Entre abril y julio (2002)
El lado oscuro (2002)
Algunas chicas doblan las piernas cuando hablan (2001)
Año cero (2001)
Nico and Dani (Krámpack) (2000)
El corazón del guerrero (2000)
La cartera (2000)
Cero en conciencia (2000)
La mujer más fea del mundo (1999)
Paréntesis (1999) (corto)
Discotheque (1999)
El nacimiento de un imperio (1998)
Carreteras secundarias (Backroads) (1997)
La buena vida (1996)

Television
London Street
La boda,
Love story,
Moder no hay más que guan,
Yo zoy ingléz
A las once en casa
A flor de piel,
Ellas son así
Ahora o nunca,
Catering de amor,
Cocinando con su enemigo
Cosas de mujer,
Crisis, ¡qué crisis!
No hay más preguntas
Aquí no hay quien viva
Érase un premio
Diez en Ibiza

External links
 

Spanish male film actors
1980 births
Spanish male television actors
Male actors from Madrid
Living people